Princess Lalla Aicha of Morocco (17 June 1930 – 4 September 2011) was the younger sister of the late King Hassan II of Morocco, and daughter of King Mohammed V of Morocco and his second wife, Lalla Abla bint Tahar.

Biography
Princess Lalla Aicha was born at Rabat Royal Palace in Rabat, she was privately educated in Rabat and awarded a Baccalauréat degree. The exile in 1953 of Mohammed V and his family on Corsica interrupted her studies in languages. 

In 1947, when she was seventeen, she appeared in public unveiled with the support of her father the King, who wished to send a signal that he supported the emancipation of women. 
She came to play a role in the women's rights in Morocco: she held speeches in favor of women's education, and represented Morocco at an international women's conference in Tunisia in 1960. 

Lalla Aicha was the Ambassador of Morocco to the United Kingdom between 1965 and 1969, and then to Greece from 1969 to 1970, and to Italy between 1970 and 1973.

She was the first president of the Entraide Nationale as well as president of the Moroccan Red Crescent Society from the 1950s until 1967 and honorary president of the National Union of Moroccan Women since 1969 until her death in 2011, at age 81.

Family
She first married on 16 August 1961 (in a triple ceremony with her sisters, Malika, Fatima and their husbands), at the Dar al-Makhzin in Rabat, Moulay Hassan al-Yaqubi (also named Hassan El Yacoubi) (born 1935). Together they had two daughters:
 Lalla Zubaida al-Yaqubi (also named Zoubida El Yacoubi), Vice-Consul at New York 1985.
 Lalla Nufissa al-Yaqubi (also named Noufissa El Yacoubi), Vice-Consul at New York 1986.

Secondly, after their divorce in 1972, she married in August 1972 Moulay Hassan al-Mahdi (1912-1984), third son of Moulay Muhammad al-Mahdi bin Ismail, Khalifa of Tetuan.

Honours
 Grand Cross of the Order of Merit of the Italian Republic of the Italian Republic (01/07/1970).
 Honorary Dame Commander of the Royal Victorian Order of the United Kingdom (DCVO, 27/10/1980).

Honorary military appointments
 Honorary Colonel of the Syrian Army (1957–2011).

See also
Princess Lalla Joumala Alaoui (her niece), current Ambassador to the United States since 2016.

References

20th-century Moroccan women
21st-century Moroccan women
1930 births
2011 deaths
Ambassadors of Morocco to the United Kingdom
Ambassadors of Morocco to Greece
Ambassadors of Morocco to Italy
Honorary Dames Commander of the Royal Victorian Order
Knights Grand Cross of the Order of Merit of the Italian Republic
Moroccan exiles in Madagascar
Moroccan princesses
Moroccan women ambassadors
Moroccan women diplomats
People from Rabat
Daughters of kings